The Shuswap Indian Band (Shuswap language: Kenpesq’t ) is a member government of the Shuswap Nation Tribal Council and also of the Ktunaxa Kinbasket Tribal Council, located in the East Kootenay region of the Canadian province of British Columbia.  Its main reserve, the Shuswap Indian Reserve, is located one mile north of Invermere, British Columbia in the Columbia Valley region of the Rocky Mountain Trench on the upper Columbia River, on the other side of the Selkirk Mountains from other Secwepemc bands.  It was created when the government of the then-Colony of British Columbia established an Indian reserve system in the 1860s.  Though a member of the Ktunaxa Kinbasket Tribal Council and intermarried with the Ktunaxa bands in the same region, the members of the band are ethnically Secwepemc (Shuswap).

Kinbasket Lake, now the name of the reservoir formed by Mica Dam, was named in 1866 by Walter Moberly, in honour of Kinbasket, a chief of the Columbia River Shuswap whom he had employed.

References

External links
Shuswap Indian Band, Shuswap Nation Tribal Council website

Secwepemc governments
Columbia Valley